José Felipe Voloch (born 13 February 1963, in Rio de Janeiro) is a Brazilian mathematician who works on number theory and algebraic geometry and is a professor at Canterbury University.

Career
Voloch earned his Ph.D. from the University of Cambridge in 1985 under the supervision of John William Scott Cassels.
He was a professor at the University of Texas, Austin.

Awards
He is a member of the Brazilian Academy of Sciences.

Selected publications

References

External links
https://scholar.google.com/citations?user=r0Jun08AAAAJ

Brazilian mathematicians
1963 births
Living people
People from Rio de Janeiro (city)
Members of the Brazilian Academy of Sciences
Number theorists
Algebraic geometers
University of Texas at Austin faculty
Alumni of the University of Cambridge
Brazilian expatriate academics in the United States